Plurality voting refers to electoral systems in which a candidate, or candidates, who poll more than any other counterpart (that is, receive a plurality), are elected. In systems based on single-member districts, it elects just one member per district and may also be referred to as first-past-the-post (FPTP), single-member plurality (SMP/SMDP), single-choice voting (an imprecise term as non-plurality voting systems may also use a single choice), simple plurality  or relative majority (as opposed to an absolute majority, where more than half of votes is needed, this is called majority voting). A system which elects multiple winners elected at once with the plurality rule, such as one based on multi-seat districts, is referred to as plurality block voting.

Plurality voting is distinguished from majority voting, in which a winning candidate must receive an absolute majority of votes: more than half of all votes (more than all other candidates combined if each voter has one vote). Under plurality voting, the leading candidate, whether or not they have a majority of votes, is elected. Not every winner-takes-all system (called majoritarian representation in the study of electoral systems, a term separate from majority voting) is plurality voting; for example, instant-runoff voting is one non-plurality winner-takes-all system. Also, not every plurality voting method is majoritarian, for example limited voting or the single non-transferable vote use plurality rules, but are considered semi-proportional systems.

Plurality voting is still used to elect members of a legislative assembly or executive officers in only a handful of countries, mostly in the English speaking world, for historical reasons. It is used in most elections in the United States, the lower house (Lok Sabha) in India and elections to the British House of Commons and English local elections in the United Kingdom, and federal and provincial elections in Canada. An example for a "winner-take-all" plurality voting is system used at the state-level for election of most of the Electoral College in United States presidential elections. This system is called party block voting, also called the general ticket.

Proponents of electoral reform generally argue against plurality voting systems in favour of either other single winner systems (such as ranked-choice voting methods) or proportional representation (such as the single transferable vote or open list PR).

Voting
In single-winner plurality voting, each voter is allowed to vote for only one candidate, and the winner of the election is the candidate who represents a plurality of voters or, in other words, received the largest number of votes. That makes plurality voting among the simplest of all electoral systems for voters and vote counting officials (however, the drawing of district boundary lines can be very contentious in the plurality system).

In an election for a legislative body with single-member seats, each voter in a geographically defined electoral district may vote for one candidate from a list of the candidates who are competing to represent that district. Under the plurality system, the winner of the election then becomes the representative of the entire electoral district and serves with representatives of other electoral districts.

In an election for a single seat, such as for president in a presidential system, the same style of ballot is used, and the winner is whichever candidate receives the largest number of votes.

In the two-round system, usually the top two candidates in the first ballot progress to the second round, also called the runoff.

In a multiple-member plurality election with n seats available, the winners are the n candidates with the highest numbers of votes. The rules may allow the voter to vote for one candidate, up to n candidates, or some other number.

Single-member vs multi-member plurality voting 
Single-member plurality voting systems, often known as first past the post, is a simple system to use. The candidate who gets more votes than any of the other candidate(s) will be declared the winning candidate.  Depending on the number of candidates and their popularity within the community, it is possible that the winning candidate will not need the majority to win, this is called the spoiler effect. Multi-Member Plurality electoral systems, are a bit more complicated to carry out. The candidates at the top who get more votes than others will be considered the winner.

Ballot types

Generally, plurality ballots can be categorized into two forms. The simplest form is a blank ballot in which the name of a candidate(s) is written in by hand. A more structured ballot will list all the candidates and allow a mark to be made next to the name of a single candidate (or more than one, in some cases); however, a structured ballot can also include space for a write-in candidate.

Examples of plurality voting

Plurality voting is used for local and/or national elections in 43 of the 193 countries that are members of the United Nations. It is particularly prevalent in the United Kingdom, the United States, Canada and India.

General elections in the United Kingdom
The United Kingdom, like the United States and Canada, uses single-member districts as the base for national elections. Each electoral district (constituency) chooses one member of parliament, the candidate who gets the most votes, whether or not they get at least 50% of the votes cast ("first past the post"). In 1992, for example, a Liberal Democrat in Scotland won a seat (Inverness, Nairn and Lochaber) with just 26% of the votes. The system of single-member districts with plurality winners tends to produce two large political parties. In countries with proportional representation there is not such a great incentive to vote for a large party, which contributes to multi-party systems.

Scotland, Wales and Northern Ireland use the first-past-the-post system for UK general elections but versions of proportional representation for elections to their own assemblies and parliaments. All of the UK used one form or another of proportional representation for European Parliament elections.

The countries that inherited the British majoritarian system tend toward two large parties: one left and the other right, such as the U.S. Democrats and Republicans. Canada is an exception, with three major political parties consisting of the New Democratic Party, which is to the left; the Conservative Party, which is to the right; and the Liberal Party, which is slightly off-centre but to the left. A fourth party that no longer has major party status is the separatist Bloc Québécois party, which is territorial and runs only in Quebec. New Zealand once used the British system, which yielded two large parties as well. It also left many New Zealanders unhappy because other viewpoints were ignored, which made the New Zealand Parliament in 1993 adopt a new electoral law modelled on Germany's system of proportional representation (PR) with a partial selection by constituencies. New Zealand soon developed a more complex party system.

After the 2015 UK general election, there were calls from UKIP for a switch to the use of proportional representation after it received 3,881,129 votes that produced only one MP. The Green Party was similarly underrepresented, which contrasted greatly with the SNP, a Scottish separatist party that received only 1,454,436 votes but won 56 seats because of more geographically concentrated support.

Example
This is a general example, using population percentages taken from one U.S. state for illustrative purposes.

If each voter in each city naively selects one city on the ballot (Memphis voters select Memphis, Nashville voters select Nashville, and so on), Memphis will be selected, as it has the most votes (42%). Note that the system does not require that the winner have a majority, only a plurality. Memphis wins because it has the most votes even though 58% of the voters in the example preferred Memphis least. That problem does not arise with the two-round system in which Nashville would have won. (In practice, with FPTP, many voters in Chattanooga and Knoxville are likely to vote tactically for Nashville: see below.)

Disadvantages

Tactical voting

To a much greater extent than many other electoral methods, plurality electoral systems encourage tactical voting techniques like "compromising". Voters are under pressure to vote for one of the two candidates most likely to win even if their true preference is neither of them because a vote for any other candidate is unlikely to lead to the preferred candidate being elected. This will instead reduce support for one of the two major candidates whom the voter might prefer to the other. Electors who prefer not to waste their vote by voting for a candidate with a very low chance of winning their constituency vote for their lesser preferred candidate who has a higher chance of winning. The minority party will then simply take votes away from one of the major parties, which could change the outcome and gain nothing for the voters. Any other party will typically need to build up its votes and credibility over a series of elections before it is seen as electable.

In the Tennessee example, if all the voters for Chattanooga and Knoxville had instead voted for Nashville, Nashville would have won (with 58% of the vote). That would have only been the third choice for those voters, but voting for their respective first choices (their own cities) actually results in their fourth choice (Memphis) being elected.

The difficulty is sometimes summed up in an extreme form, as "All votes for anyone other than the second place are votes for the winner". That is because by voting for other candidates, voters have denied those votes to the second-place candidate, who could have won had they received them. It is often claimed by United States Democrats that Democrat Al Gore lost the 2000 Presidential Election to Republican George W. Bush because some voters on the left voted for Ralph Nader of the Green Party, who, exit polls indicated, would have preferred Gore at 45% to Bush at 27%, with the rest not voting in Nader's absence.

That thinking is illustrated by elections in Puerto Rico and its three principal voter groups: the Independentistas (pro-independence), the Populares (pro-commonwealth), and the Estadistas (pro-statehood). Historically, there has been a tendency for Independentista voters to elect Popular candidates and policies. The phenomenon is responsible for some Popular victories even though the Estadistas have the most voters on the island. It is so widely recognised that the Puerto Ricans sometimes call the Independentistas who vote for the Populares "melons" in reference to the party colours because the fruit is green on the outside but red on the inside.

Because voters have to predict who the top two candidates will be, that can cause significant perturbation to the system:

Substantial power is given to the news media. Some voters will tend to believe the media's assertions as to who the leading contenders are likely to be in the election. Even voters who distrust the media know that other voters believe the media and so those candidates who receive the most media attention will nonetheless be the most popular and thus most likely to be in one of the top two.
A newly appointed candidate, who is actually supported by the majority of voters, may be considered by the lack of a track record not to be likely to become one of the top two candidates. The candidate will thus receive a reduced number of votes, which will then give a reputation as a low poller in future elections, which compounds the problem.
The system may promote votes against than for a candidate. In the UK, entire campaigns have been organised with the aim of voting against the Conservative Party by voting either Labour or Liberal Democrat. For example, in a constituency held by the Conservatives, with the Liberal Democrats as the second-placed party and the Labour Party in third, Labour supporters might be urged to vote for the Liberal Democrat candidate, who has a smaller majority to close and more support in the constituency, than their own candidate on the basis that Labour supporters would prefer an MP from a competing leftist or liberal party than a Conservative one. Similarly, in Labour/Liberal Democrat marginals in which the Conservatives are third, Conservative voters may be encouraged or tempted to vote Liberal Democrat to help defeat Labour.
If enough voters use this tactic, the first-past-the-post system becomes, effectively, runoff voting, a completely different system, in which the first round is held in the court of public opinion, a good example being the 1997 Winchester by-election.

Proponents of other single-winner electoral systems argue that their proposals would reduce the need for tactical voting and reduce the spoiler effect. Examples include the commonly used two-round system of runoffs and instant-runoff voting, along with less-tested systems such as approval voting, score voting and Condorcet methods.

Fewer political parties

Duverger's law is a theory that constituencies that use first-past-the-post systems will have a two-party system after enough time. The two-dominating parties regularly alternate in power and easily win constituencies due to the structure of plurality voting systems. This puts smaller parties who struggle to meet the threshold of votes at a disadvantage, and inhibits growth.

Plurality voting tends to reduce the number of political parties to a greater extent than most other methods do, making it more likely that a single party will hold a majority of legislative seats. (In the United Kingdom, 22 out of 27 general elections since 1922 have produced a single-party majority government or, in the case of the National Governments, a parliament from which such a single-party government could have been drawn.)

Plurality voting's tendency toward fewer parties and more-frequent majorities of one party can also produce government that may not consider as wide a range of perspectives and concerns. It is entirely possible that a voter finds all major parties to have similar views on issues and that a voter does not have a meaningful way of expressing a dissenting opinion through their vote.

As fewer choices are offered to voters, voters may vote for a candidate although they disagree with them because they disagree even more with their opponents. That will make candidates less closely reflect the viewpoints of those who vote for them.

Furthermore, one-party rule is more likely to lead to radical changes in government policy even though the changes are favoured only by a plurality or a bare majority of the voters, but a multi-party system usually requires more consensus to make dramatic changes in policy.

Wasted votes

Wasted votes are those cast for candidates who are virtually sure to lose in a safe seat, and votes cast for winning candidates in excess of the number required for victory. Plurality voting systems function on a "winner-takes-all" principle, which means that the party of the losing candidate in each riding receives no representation in government, regardless of the amount of votes they received. For example, in the UK general election of 2005, 52% of votes were cast for losing candidates and 18% were excess votes, a total of 70% wasted votes. That is perhaps the most fundamental criticism of FPTP since a large majority of votes may play no part in determining the outcome. Alternative electoral systems, such as Proportional Representation, attempt to ensure that almost all of the votes are effective in influencing the result, which minimizes vote wastage. Such a system decreases disproportionality in election results and is credited for increasing voter turnout.

Voter turnout 
Voter apathy is prevalent in plurality voting systems such as FPTP. Studies suggest that plurality voting system fails to incentivize citizens to vote, which results in very low voter turnouts. Under this system, many people feel that voting is an empty ritual that has no influence on the composition of legislature. Voters are not assured that the number of seats that political parties are accorded will reflect the popular vote, which disincentives them from voting and sends the message that their votes are not valued, and participation in elections does not seem necessary.

Strategic voting 
This is when a voter decides to vote in a way that does not represent their true preference or choice, motivated by an intent to influence election outcomes. Strategic behaviour by voters can and does influence the outcome of voting in different plurality voting systems. Strategic behaviour is when a voter casts their vote for a different party or alternative riding in order to induce, in their opinion, a better outcome. An example of this is when a person really likes party A but votes for party B because they do not like party C or D or because they believe that party A has little to no chance to win. This can cause the outcome of very close votes to be swayed for the wrong reason. This might have had an impact on the 2000 United States election that was essentially decided by fewer than 600 votes, with the winner being President Bush. When voters behave in a strategic way and expect others to do the same, they end up voting for one of the two leading candidates, making the Condorcet alternative more likely to be elected. The prevalence of strategic voting in an election makes it difficult to evaluate the true political state of the population, as their true political ideologies are not reflected in their votes.

Gerrymandering
Because FPTP permits a high level of wasted votes, an election under FPTP is easily gerrymandered unless safeguards are in place. In gerrymandering, a party in power deliberately manipulates constituency boundaries to increase the number of seats that it wins unfairly.

In brief, if a governing party G wishes to reduce the seats that will be won by opposition party O in the next election, it can create a number of constituencies in each of which O has an overwhelming majority of votes. O will win these seats, but many of its voters will waste their votes. Then, the rest of the constituencies are designed to have small majorities for G. Few G votes are wasted, and G will win many seats by small margins. As a result of the gerrymander, O's seats have cost it more votes than G's seats.

Efficiency gap 
The efficiency gap measures gerrymandering and has been scrutinized in the Supreme Court of the United States. The efficiency gap is the difference between the two parties' wasted votes, divided by the total number of votes.

Manipulation charges
The presence of spoilers often gives rise to suspicions that manipulation of the slate has taken place. The spoiler may have received incentives to run. A spoiler may also drop out at the last moment, which induces charges that such an act was intended from the beginning. Voters who are uninformed do not have a comparable opportunity to manipulate their votes as voters who understand all opposing sides, understand the pros and cons of voting for each party.

Spoiler effect

The spoiler effect is the effect of vote splitting between candidates or ballot questions with similar ideologies. One spoiler candidate's presence in the election draws votes from a major candidate with similar politics, which causes a strong opponent of both or several to win. Smaller parties can disproportionately change the outcome of an FPTP election by swinging what is called the 50-50% balance of two party systems by creating a faction within one or both ends of the political spectrum. This shifts the winner of the election from an absolute majority outcome to a plurality outcome. Due to the spoiler effect, the party that holds the unfavourable ideology by the majority will win, as the majority of the population would be split between the two parties with the similar ideology. In comparison, electoral systems that use proportional representation have small groups win only their proportional share of representation.

Issues specific to particular countries

Solomon Islands
In August 2008, Sir Peter Kenilorea commented on what he perceived as the flaws of a first-past-the-post electoral system in the Solomon Islands:

International examples

The United Kingdom continues to use the first-past-the-post electoral system for general elections, and for local government elections in England and Wales. Changes to the UK system have been proposed, and alternatives were examined by the Jenkins Commission in the late 1990s. After the formation of a new coalition government in 2010, it was announced as part of the coalition agreement that a referendum would be held on switching to the alternative vote system. However the alternative vote system was rejected 2-1 by British voters in a referendum held on 5 May 2011.

Canada also uses FPTP for national and provincial elections. In May 2005 the Canadian province of British Columbia had a referendum on abolishing single-member district plurality in favour of multi-member districts with the Single Transferable Vote system after the Citizens' Assembly on Electoral Reform made a recommendation for the reform. The referendum obtained 57% of the vote, but failed to meet the 60% requirement for passing. A second referendum was held in May 2009, this time the province's voters defeated the change with 39% voting in favour.

An October 2007 referendum in the Canadian province of Ontario on adopting a Mixed Member Proportional system, also requiring 60% approval, failed with only 36.9% voting in favour. British Columbia again called a referendum on the issue in 2018 which was defeated by 62% voting to keep current system.

Northern Ireland, Scotland, Wales, the Republic of Ireland, Australia and New Zealand are notable examples of countries within the UK, or with previous links to it, that use non-FPTP electoral systems (Northern Ireland, Scotland and Wales use FPTP in United Kingdom general elections, however).

Nations which have undergone democratic reforms since 1990 but have not adopted the FPTP system include South Africa, almost all of the former Eastern bloc nations, Russia, and Afghanistan.

List of countries

Countries that use plurality voting to elect the lower or only house of their legislature include:

Antigua and Barbuda
Azerbaijan
Bahamas
Bangladesh
Barbados
Belize
Bermuda
Bhutan
Botswana
Burma (Myanmar)
Canada
Comoros
Congo (Brazzaville)
Cook Islands
Cote d'Ivoire
Dominica
Eritrea
Ethiopia
Gabon
Gambia
Ghana
Grenada
India
Iran
Jamaica
Kenya
Kuwait
Laos
Liberia
Malawi
Malaysia
Maldives
Marshall Islands
Federated States of Micronesia
Nigeria
Niue
Oman
Palau
Saint Kitts and Nevis
Saint Lucia
Saint Vincent and the Grenadines
Samoa
Seychelles
Sierra Leone
Singapore
Solomon Islands
Swaziland
Tanzania
Tonga
Trinidad and Tobago
Tuvalu
Uganda
United Kingdom
United States
Yemen
Zambia

See also
2006 Texas gubernatorial election – Example of an incumbent governor, Rick Perry, winning re-election despite gaining less than 40 percent of the vote
Cube rule
Deviation from proportionality
Plurality-at-large voting
List of democracy and elections-related topics
Instant-runoff voting
Approval Voting
Score voting
Single non-transferable vote
Single transferable vote
Runoff voting

References

The fatal flaws of Plurality (first-past-the-post) electoral systems – Proportional Representation Society of Australia

Electoral systems